Klüssendorf is a surname. Notable people with the surname include:

 Angelika Klüssendorf (born 1958), German writer
 Tim Klüssendorf (born 1991), German politician

Surnames of German origin
German-language surnames